Venus in Furs is an 1870 novella by Leopold von Sacher-Masoch.

In music, Venus in Furs may refer to:
"Venus in Furs" (song), by the Velvet Underground
A song by Electric Wizard, from the album Black Masses
The Venus in Furs, a fictional band created for the 1998 movie Velvet Goldmine

As a film or play, Venus in Furs may refer to:
Venus in Furs (1965 film), directed by Piero Heliczer
Venus in Furs (1967 film), directed by Joseph Marzano
Venus in Furs (1969 Franco film), directed by Jesús Franco
Venus in Furs (1969 Dallamano film), directed by Massimo Dallamano
Seduction: The Cruel Woman, 1985 West German film directed by Elfi Mikesch and Monika Treut 
Venus in Furs (1995 film), directed by Victor Nieuwenhuijs and Maartje Seyferth
Venus in Fur, a two-character play by David Ives that premiered in 2010
Venus in Furs (2012 film), a 2012 Korean film (Korean: 모피를 입은 비너스) directed by Song Yae-sup (송예섭)
Venus in Fur (film), a 2013 French film based on the play and directed by Roman Polanski